The Good Old Naughty Days, released in 2002, is a compilation from over 300 recently discovered film clips from silent hardcore pornographic films made between 1905 and 1930, re-edited by director Michel Reilhac, with a new soundtrack by Eric Le Guen. Most of the films were made in France and were intended to be shown in brothels. The collection also includes a pornographic animation from the United States, Eveready Harton in Buried Treasure, made by unknown artists in or around 1928 and never theatrically released before.

Themes covered include pornographic adaptations of classics such as Madame Butterfly, precursors of pornography clichés such as the encounter between the "musketeer" and the milkmaid, stock characters such as lascivious nuns and priests, and footage showing bestiality (sexual acts with animals), which according to the film-maker Michel Reilhac shows that "the modern porn industry did not invent anything – everything had already been filmed by our great-grandparents."

At the time of its release (2003) it was the first R18 film to be rated for display in cinemas in the United Kingdom for over ten years, despite its contents, partly due to its 'classic' style and age and as "historical footage".

References

External links 
 
 

Compilation films
French black-and-white films
2000s pornographic films
Animal pornography
2002 films
Films with live action and animation
Films set in France
Prostitution in Paris
Censored films